Ooni Lafogido was the 10th Ooni of Ife, a paramount traditional ruler of Ile Ife, the ancestral home of the Yorubas. He succeeded Ooni Lajodoogun and was succeeded by  
Odidimode Rogbeesin.

References

Oonis of Ife
Yoruba history